Venkiteswaran Chittur Subramanian (born 23 May 1959) is an Indian film critic, professor, documentary filmmaker, writer and occasional subtitler from Chalakudi, Kerala, India, who writes predominantly in English and Malayalam. He won the National Film Award for Best Film Critic in 2009.

Career 
He is known for his insightful analysis of the social aspects of cinema and their artistic fulfilment. His writings and reviews on film and media, in English and Malayalam has been published in journals such as Deep Focus, Film International, Cinema in India, Bhashaposhini, Pachakuthira, Indian Express, The Hindu, Mathrubhumi and Madhyamam. His column "Rumblestrip"(1999–2008) in Indian Express talked about film and the media scene in Kerala.

He published a book on filmmaker K R Mohanan Samanthara Yathrakal – K R Mohanante Cinema and with Lalit Mohan Joshi edited a book on filmmaker Adoor Gopalakrishnan, A Door to Adoor. Three books, containing Venkiteswaran's collection of articles that take a critical look at major trends and milestones in Malayalam cinema, were published by DC Books at the DC International Book Fair and Cultural Fest, 2011. The book Malayala Cinema Padanangal won a Special Jury Mention in the State film awards for the year 2011. He has interviewed film personalities including Adoor Gopalakrishnan, T.V. Chandran, Werner Herzog and Jean-Luc Godard.

He is a documentary filmmaker and won the National Award for Best Arts/Cultural Film in 1995 along with M.R. Rajan for Pakarnattam – Ammannur, The Actor, the lyrical cinematic documentation of the life of Ammannur Madhava Chakyar, the exponent of the ancient classical Sanskrit theatrical artform of Koodiyattam. This film won the Kerala State Award for the Best Documentary category in the same year. His article "Tea-shops In Mayalam Cinema" was included in the revamped Kerala SCERT Class X English textbook in 2011.

He is the Artistic Director of the Signs film festival for short films and documentaries. He was a jury member for best writing on cinema at the 60th National Film Awards.
In July 2018, he resigned from the Kerala State Chalachitra Academy as a gesture of protest against the state government's decision to invite a superstar (Mohanlal) as the chief guest for the event as well as the anti-women stance taken up by the organisation Association of Malayalam Movie Artistes (AMMA), of which Mohanlal is the president.

Venkiteswaran is also an occasional subtitler. He began by subtitling for a T.V. Chandran film in the late 1990s and done subtitles for around 150 films in the span of 20 years.

Awards 
 2011: Kerala State Award – Special Jury Award for Best Book on Cinema – Malayala Cinema Padanangal.
 2011: Kerala State Television Awards for Best Malayalam article on TV – Avatharippichu Nashtapeduthunna Varthakal in Mathrubhumi weekly.
 2009: Best Film Critic (Swarna Kamal)
 2005: Kerala State Film Award for Best Article on Cinema – "Mammootty enna Thaaram"(Malayalam)
 2002: National Film Award – Special Jury Award / Special Mention for Film Criticism (English)
 1995: National Film Award for Best Arts/Cultural Film (Rajat Kamal)- Pakarnnattam – Ammannur the actor, shared with M.R. Rajan 
 1995: Kerala State Film Award for Best Documentary – Pakarnnattam – Ammannur the actor, shared with M.R. Rajan

Bibliography 
Translation

 Ten Sentences about the Cow - Poems by NG Unnikrishnan, Author Press, 2017
English:
A Door to Adoor (Edited by Lalit Mohan Joshi & C.S. Venkiteswaran), South Asian Cinema Foundation, London, 2006

Malayalam:
Udalinte Tharasancharangal, DC Books, 2011
Malayala Cinema Padanangal , DC Books, 2011 (reviewed by B.R.P. Bhaskar)
Cinema Talkies, DC Books, 2012
Raveendrante Thirakkathakal, Mathrubhumi Books, 2013
Television Padanangal - Nammeyokkeyum Bandhicha Sadhanam - Mathrubhumi Books, 2014
Samanthara Yathrakal – K R Mohanante Cinema , Trichur International Film Festival
Malayaliyude Nava Madhyama Jeevitham, DC Books, 2018
Ini Velicham Mathram - Film and Vision of Fernando Solanas, Kerala State Chalachitra Academy, 2019
Prapancham Prathiphalikkunna Jalakanam, SPCS Books, 2022
Kaalathinte Irulbhoopadangal - Bela Tarr’s cinematic journey, Kerala State Chalachitra Academy, 2022

Filmography 
Pakarnattam: Ammannur, The Actor – Duration – 75 mins, Year – 1995. — A Documentary on Ammannur Madhava Chakyar directed along with M.R.Rajan.
Matha to Ma – Duration – 70 mins, Year – 2002. — A Documentary on Mandakini Narayanan.
Mega Narratives are Fantastic – Duration – 40 mins, Year – 2010.— A Documentary on Chintha Ravi.

References 

1959 births
Living people
Indian documentary filmmakers
Indian film critics
Kerala State Film Award winners
Malayalam-language writers
Film directors from Kerala
Scholars from Kerala
People from Chalakudy
20th-century Indian biographers
20th-century Indian male writers
Koodiyattam exponents
Best Critic National Film Award winners